Chowki No.11 is a 1978 Hindi-language action film, produced by Kuki on Reaching New Heights banner and directed by  V.K.Sobti. Starring Vinod Mehra, Amjad Khan, Zarina Wahab  while Jeetendra has given special appearance and music composed by Sonik Omi.

Plot
Vijay (Vinod Mehra) a gangster whose father Dindayal is slaughtered by a local goon Krishna in his childhood. At present, Krishna turns into a deadly gangster KK. Besides, Shankar is his henchmen. Initially, Shankar & Vijay are rivals but later befriends. Parallelly, Vijay falls for a court dancer Ranjani. Once, KK assigns them a task to kidnap a child Jimmy grandson of multimillionaire Seth Chetan Das. During this, Shankar realizes that Jimmy’s widowed mother is his ex-lover Shanno, and the child is his own.

Indeed, Shankar is a truck driver, trustworthy to the Police too, and never scanned at most secured beachhead Check Post No: 11. He loves Shanno and consummates before marriage. As a result, Shanno becomes pregnant and Shankar decides to immediately marry her. Besides, Shanno works as a servant for a wise Jeeten a terminally ill cancer patient, and they maintain a cordial relationship. Since Shankar is compelled, he accepts the deal of KK to cross smuggled goods from Check Post No: 11, but unfortunately, he is caught and sentenced. Right now, Shanno attempts suicide when Jeeten saves and knits her to provide legitimacy to the child. Here Shankar & Vijay decide to protect Jimmy when Shankar pays his life while guarding Jimmy. At last, Vijay bursts out on KK and also recognizes him as the homicide of his father by the tattoo on his hand. Finally, Vijay gives a brutal death to KK.

Cast 
Vinod Mehra as Vijay
Zarina Wahab as Rajni
Aruna Irani as Shanno
Kader Khan as Krishna / K. K. 
Amjad Khan as Shankar
Jeetendra as Jeeten (Guest Appearance) 
Manmohan as Seth Chetan Das
Jagdeep as Bobby
Yunus Parvez as Police Officer
Krishan Dhawan as Shanno's Father

Soundtrack

References 

Films scored by Sonik-Omi
1970s Hindi-language films